The Sahrawi Arab Democratic Republic requires its residents to register their motor vehicles and display vehicle registration plates.

Format 

Sahrawi cars are marked by the following tokens. Regular license plates have format SH-12-34567, yellow with black characters, implemented in 1976. 

Government license plates have format GSH-12-34567, green with black characters, also implemented from 1976.

History 
Before 1976 there were operating Spanish plates series SH.

Special license plates 
Plates of Sahrawi People's Liberation Army have format 123456789, white with black markings and with Sahrawi flag, implemented from 1976.

There are also plates of MINURSO vehicles in use from 1991.

Gallery

References

Sahrawi Arab Democratic Republic
Law of the Sahrawi Arab Democratic Republic